The Victorian Railways M class were 4-4-0T (tank) steam locomotives for suburban passenger service in Melbourne, a pattern engine being supplied in 1879 by Beyer, Peacock & Co. Twenty-one further locomotives of this model were built by the Phoenix Foundry of Ballarat, in three batches, from 1884 to 1886. They were numbered 40 (pattern engine), 210-240 (even numbers only), and 312-320 (evens only), and were classed M in 1886.

Because their relatively small coal bunker proved inadequate for the rapidly expanding suburban network of the 1880s, they were rebuilt between 1901 and 1905 at the Newport Workshops as 4-4-2T locomotives. At the same time, the opportunity was taken to replace the troublesome leading Bissell truck with one of the design being used successfully on the contemporary 'New' A and D class locomotives. The rebuilt locomotives were regarded as equivalent to the Victorian Railways' ubiquitous E class 2-4-2T suburban engines for rostering purposes, and were known as the ME class, although the original 'M' class plates carried on the locomotives were not altered.

The re-built engines proved very successful in service, and withdrawals did not commence until 1913, following the introduction of the larger DDE (later D4) class suburban tank engines from 1908. The last ME locomotives were scrapped in 1922, having been rendered surplus by the conversion of suburban lines to electric traction from 1919 onwards. None have been preserved.

References

External links
 Diagram of M class 4-4-0T locomotive, PROV
 M Class Steam Locomotive, perspective view, PROV
 M Class Steam Locomotive No.212, side view of Tank Engine at Phoenix Foundry, PROV
 Diagram of ME class 4-4-2T locomotive, PROV
 ME Class Steam Locomotive No.318, side view of Tank Engine at Spencer St, PROV
 ME Class Steam Locomotive No.214, PROV

M class
4-4-2T locomotives
Broad gauge locomotives in Australia
4-4-0T locomotives
Scrapped locomotives